The Sermon of Saint John the Baptist (or The Preaching of Saint John the Baptist) is a painting of 1566 by Pieter Bruegel the Elder in the Museum of Fine Arts in Budapest, Hungary. It was painted as oil on panel.

External links
 
 The Sermon of Saint John the Baptist on Google Arts and Culture

1566 paintings
Paintings by Pieter Bruegel the Elder
Paintings depicting John the Baptist
Paintings in the collection of the Museum of Fine Arts (Budapest)